The Comfort Maple tree is an individual sugar maple (Acer saccharum) located in Comfort Maple Conservation Area in the Town of Pelham, Ontario.  The tree is estimated (not based upon a complete ring count) to be about 500 years old. If correct, it would make this one of the oldest sugar maple trees in Canada.

The tree is named for the Comfort family, who acquired the land in 1816.  A township map from later in the 19th century shows the land owned by John B. Comfort, and a sign at the site tells visitors that the tree and the land around it were donated to the Niagara Peninsula Conservation Authority on April 30, 1961 by Miss Edna Eleanor Comfort. The current owner of the Comfort Maple is Dr. Paul Coyne.

Due to the rigors of age as well as at least one major lightning strike, the tree has been repaired over the years with bricks, concrete, and guy wires. The conservation area is located at the end of a narrow lane off Metler Road. (Niagara Regional Rd. 28) near North Pelham. It is surrounded by farm land. It is just  and has a small parking area. The Comfort Maple was designated a heritage tree in June 2000 under the Ontario Heritage Act (OHA). (7)

See also 
 List of individual trees
 List of oldest trees

References

External links 
 Satellite view of Comfort Maple

Trees of Ontario
Protected areas of the Regional Municipality of Niagara
Individual trees in Canada